The twospot flounder (Bothus robinsi)  is a species of lefteye flounder native to the western Atlantic Ocean along the American coast from New York, United States to Brazil where it is mostly found at depths of from , sometimes recorded to a depth of .  This species grows to a length of  TL, though most do not exceed  TL.  This species is of minor importance to local commercial fisheries.

References

External links
 

Bothidae
Fish described in 1972